The 2016 Ligue Haïtienne season was the 53rd season of top-tier football in Haiti. It began on 21 February 2016. The league is split into two tournaments—the Série d'Ouverture and the Série de Clôture—each with identical formats and each contested by the same 18 teams.

In a change from last year, the number of teams in the league has been reduced from 20 to 18.

Teams

At the end of the 2015 season, the bottom 4 teams in the aggregate table; Valencia, PNH, US Lajeune, and Racine FC; were relegated to the Haitian second level leagues. Replacing them were two clubs from the Haitian second level leagues; Réal du Cap and Juventus.

Série d'Ouverture

The 2016 Série d'Ouverture began on 20 February 2016 and ended on 28 May 2016.

Regular season

Standings

Results

Playoffs

Semifinals

Finals

Série de Clôture

The 2016 Série de Clôture began on 12 August 2016 and ended on 24 December 2016.

Regular season

Standings

Results

Playoffs

Semifinals

Finals

Trophée des Champions
This match is contested between the winner of the Série d'Ouverture and the winner of the Série de Clôture.

Aggregate table

References

External links
RSSSF

2016
Haiti
Haiti 
2016 in Haitian sport